is a Japanese actor and model affiliated with Oscar Promotion. He played the role of Nagi Matsuo/Ki Ninger in the 2015 Super Sentai TV series Shuriken Sentai Ninninger.

Biography
From 2010 to 2011, Nakamura made regular appearances in the NHK Educational TV series Tensai TV-kun MAX. He was an exclusive model for the fashion magazine Nico☆Petit in 2012, and for Pichi Lemon from 2013 to 2015. In 2015, Nakamura made his acting debut with the role of Nagi Matsuo/Ki Ninger in the 39th Super Sentai TV series Shuriken Sentai Ninninger.

Filmography

TV dramas

Films
{| class="wikitable"
|- 
! Year
! Title
! Role
! Other notes
|-
|rowspan="3"| 2015 || Ressha Sentai ToQger vs. Kyoryuger: The Movie || Ki Ninger (voice) || Cameo
|-
|Super Hero Taisen GP: Kamen Rider 3 || Nagi Matsuo/Ki Ninger ||
|-
|Shuriken Sentai Ninninger the Movie: The Dinosaur Lord's Splendid Ninja Scroll! || Nagi Matsuo/Ki Ninger ||
|-
| rowspan="2"|2016 || Shuriken Sentai Ninninger vs. ToQger the Movie: Ninja in Wonderland || Nagi Matsuo/Ki Ninger ||
|-
| Come Back! Shuriken Sentai Ninninger: Ninnin Girls vs. Boys FINAL WARS'''' || Nagi Matsuo/Ki Ninger ||
|}

Variety shows
 Shittoko! Special: Children Have Infinite Power! (TBS, 2008)
 Tensai TV-kun MAX (NHK Educational TV, 2010 - 2011) - Regular guest

Commercials
 Glade (Johnson, 2012)

Music videos
 1 2 3 ~Love Begins~ (Ikimono-gakari, 2013)

Radio programs
 Telephone Consultation Services for Children All over Japan: Real! (TBS Radio, 2012 - 2013) - Regular guest

Magazines
 Nico☆Petit (Shinchosha, 2012) - Exclusive model
 Pichi Lemon'' (Gakken Plus, 2013 - 2015) - Exclusive model

References

External links
 Official profile at Oscar Promotion 
 

21st-century Japanese male actors
Japanese male models
1998 births
Living people
People from Nagoya